Hopwood Hall is a Grade II* historic house in Middleton, Greater Manchester, England, which was the ancestral country home of the landed gentry family of Hopwood who held it from the 12th century, passing to the Gregge (later Gregge-Hopwood, then Hopwood) family and remaining in their possession until it was closed up in 1922. The Hall was sold in 1946, and after a series of temporary residents, by the 1980s it had fallen into disrepair; in 2018 it was placed under renovation by the new owner, an American actor who is descended from the Hopwoods through John Hopwood (1745–1802). 

Hopwood Hall was founded as a moated site. Later, the property had pleasure grounds and an extensive park with scattered woods. Features in the grounds included a kitchen garden, ice house, ha-ha, Italian garden, fountain, corn mill and small cross-shaped bower or grotto.

Hopwood Hall also gives its name to an electoral ward in the Metropolitan Borough of Rochdale and to Hopwood Hall College, a further education college with a campus within the original estate grounds.

History and architecture
The property is conjectured by historians to have first been built upon in the 12th century, possibly by Normans in the period after the Norman Conquest. It is thought there may be archaeological remains of former structures underneath the current hall. The family name Hopwood is a corruption of "Hopwode", from the Old English hop (valley among hills) + wudu (wood), and dates from when a knight was granted land between the then townships of Hopwood, Thornham, and Middleton. These estates – Hopwood, Birch, Stanleycliffe and Thornham – were owned thereafter by the family of "Hopwode de Hopwode". The family is documented since before 1380, when Alain de Hopwood was mentioned. Edmund Hopwood was a magistrate and High Sheriff of Lancashire during the Commonwealth of England, and a member of the Presbyterian congregation at Bury. For at least 500 years, the Hopwoods were interred at the Church of St Leonard, Middleton.

Hopwood Hall is a Grade II*-listed two-storey brick-and-stone manor house, built in a quadrangle around a timber-framed hall that has been dated to 1426. It is approximately 50,000 square feet under roof, and the estate grounds were originally over 5,000 acres before being parceled out in later years. Some of the current building dates back to the early 17th century, with some late-16th century elements. The 1830s ice house on the grounds is also listed. Hopwood Hall has been recognized for its collection of unusual intricate Jacobean stonework and wood carvings around fireplaces and doors. One carving of a lion looks more like a monkey; it is believed the artist had never seen a lion before and was working from a written description. A carving on the fireplace in "The Lord Byron bedroom" is thought to be a likeness of the 14th-century Edward II of England. 

By 1750, the number of staff at Hopwood Hall was greater than the entire population of Middleton, the village in which it is located. This included butlers, maids, cooks, cleaners, attendants, carriage drivers, farmers, beekeepers, blacksmiths, butchers, weavers, wood cutters, carpenters, stablehands, horsemen and ice keepers. It had its own own farm, mill, brewery, buttery, cheesery, icehouse and orangery for fresh fruit.

The two Hopwood male heirs, Edward and Robert Hopwood, were killed during World War I. Of the estimated 30 people, staff and family, who left the hall to serve in the war, only four returned. The grieving elderly parents closed up the property and moved to London May 1922. It was put up for sale but there were no buyers. During World War II the hall was sold to the Lancashire Cotton Corporation, who manufactured military uniforms; they used it, in conjunction with Blackfriars House, to run the firm during the war years because it was a less conspicuous target for German bombers than a factory in Manchester.

After the war, in 1946, the hall was sold to a trust and became part of De La Salle College, a Roman Catholic teacher training College. On part of the estate grounds, the De La Salle Brothers built a concrete chapel (1964–65) designed by Frederick Gibberd (the architect of Liverpool Metropolitan Cathedral), now deconsecrated but a listed building. It has been retained for use by Hopwood Hall College as the Milnrow Building. 

In 1957, the hall was declared a building of historic interest. For a period, the monks made the basement into a bar and music venue for area college students, to raise revenue for upkeep of the hall; graffiti that reads "Get down and boogie" is still visible on a wall. Bands that played there included Black Sabbath, UB40 and Madness. John Lennon reportedly came there one time from Manchester to help a friend's band. In 1989, the Catholic college closed and Rochdale Metropolitan Borough Council (RBMC) bought the estate in the 1990s. A community college Hopwood Hall College was built on the grounds in 1992; Queen Elizabeth came for the opening, but the hall itself was vacated and fenced off, with only a caretaker to watch over it. 

RBMC did not have the resources to renovate or properly maintain the hall, and in 1998, Historic England placed it on its Heritage at Risk Register. In 2017, the property was 5 to 10 years away from being largely unsalvageable - dry rotted wood was the norm, water seeped from the walls and roof, floors laid bare to earth, windows were missing, a tree grew from the chimney, buildings had been vandalized.

In September 2017, the American actor and entrepreneur Hopwood DePree signed a contract with RMBC to assume responsibility for Hopwood Hall. DePree became interested in the property after researching his family history online and coming to visit; RBMC verified his family connection through American Revolutionary War-era civil servant John Hopwood, and based on that connection, offered him an opportunity to buy it under conditions that he properly restore and maintain it, at which point he would become the new owner. DePree said, "I don't think any of this would have happened without that connection." DePree,who had been living in Hollywood, moved to England to pursue the restoration full time. Emergency work to make the building structurally sound and waterproof started in May 2018.

, restoration is ongoing, at an estimated eventual cost of approximately £10.7 million ($13 million), and annual maintenance is estimated at £650,000 ($800,000), with funds raised by DePree, the Council and other sources. DePree published a book called Downton Shabby documenting the process.

Famous guests
The poet George Gordon Byron, 6th Lord Byron (1788–1824) stayed with the Gregge-Hopwood family at Hopwood Hall from the end of September 1811 for around 10 days. He had come up to try and sell parts of the Byron family estate in Rochdale, a complex deal that was not to be completed fully in his lifetime. The 23-year-old poet probably spent his days at the Hall revising the draft of his ground-breaking poem Childe Harold's Pilgrimage. In appreciation of the success of the poem, Byron gifted the Hopwood Family an extravagant fireplace dated 1658 which remains in the hall today.

Guy Fawkes visited the Hall in search of funding whilst organizing his so-called Gunpowder Plot in 1605.

See also

Grade II* listed buildings in Greater Manchester
Listed buildings in Middleton, Greater Manchester

References

External Links
Hopwood Hall Estate 

Buildings and structures in the Metropolitan Borough of Rochdale
Country houses in Greater Manchester
Grade II* listed buildings in Greater Manchester
Grade II* listed buildings in Manchester
Grade II* listed houses
Middleton, Greater Manchester